The County of Kinross or Kinross-shire is a historic county and registration county in eastern Scotland, administered as part of Perth and Kinross since 1930. Surrounding its largest settlement and county town of Kinross, the county borders Perthshire to the north and Fife to the east, south and west.

Scotland's second smallest county, Kinross-shire is dominated by Loch Leven, a large inland loch, with two islands and an internationally important nature reserve. One of the islands contains a castle, where Mary, Queen of Scots was once held prisoner. Much of the land in Kinross-shire is fertile agricultural land and most of the inhabitants were originally employed in farming. The gently-rolling farmland surrounding Loch Leven gives way to steep, more rugged terrain at the outskirts of the county.

History

The shire or sheriffdom of Kinross was formed in the thirteenth century when the two parishes of Kinross and Orwell were removed from the Fothriff area of Fife. Cleish, Portmoak and Tullibole were added by act of parliament in 1685. As local government in Scotland evolved, Kinross-shire gained a county council in 1890, which was later amalgamated with Perth County Council under the Local Government (Scotland) Act 1929. Kinross County Council was based at County Buildings, Kinross.

The county suffered a decline in population in the 19th and 20th centuries, as its inhabitants migrated to the cities to find work in manufacturing, etc. The population in 1891 was 6,673; in 1971 it was 6,423. The decline was hastened by the closure of the railways in the county soon after the Second World War. However, in recent years, construction of the M90 motorway north of the Forth Road Bridge has resulted in the area becoming more prominent.  Tourism has increased, with visitors attracted by the unspoiled country villages and gently rolling hills reaching the shores of Loch Leven. The villages of Kinnesswood and Scotlandwell are attractive, and there are ancient standing stones at Orwell. The T in the Park music festival was held in Balado from 1993 to 2014.

The economic outlook of Kinross-shire has improved and was recorded in 2009 as having an estimated population of 12,997. In addition, it outperformed both the Perth and Kinross area and Scotland averages in economic performance. The area is promoted by the Kinross-shire Partnership, a body bringing together local government, tourist organisations and local organisations.

Geography
 
Kinross-shire is landlocked and is generally flat, except in the north-west where the Ochil Hills are located, and along the southern boundary where the Cleish Hills can be found. The Ochils contain Innerdouny Hill, Kinross-shire's highest point at 497 m (1,631 ft). The most notable geographic feature of the county is Loch Leven which is also an important nature reserve; there are also several islands within the loch, the largest of which is St Serf's Inch (the others are Alice's Bower, Castle Island, Reed Bower, Roy's Folly and Scart Island). A much smaller body of water – the Arnot Reservoir – is located to the east of Loch Leven. On the far northern border a portion of the Glenfarg Reservoir lies within the county.

Subdivisions

Burgh of Kinross
Kinross-shire contained only one burgh, Kinross. The burgh was originally created a burgh of barony in 1540/1 and became a burgh of regality in 1685. In 1864 it became a police burgh with an elected town council. It continued to exist until 1975.

Civil parishes

The county was anciently divided into a number of parishes: Cleish, Orwell (containing the market town of Milnathort), Kinross and Portmoak were entirely in Kinross-shire. The parishes of Arngask, Fossoway, Tulliebole and Forgandenny were partly in Perthshire. From 1845 they were used for local government purposes and governed by parochial boards.

The Local Government (Scotland) Act 1889 created a boundary commission to ensure that all civil parishes lay within a single county. After the boundary changes the county contained five parishes: Fossoway (No. 1 on map), Orwell (2), Kinross (3), Portmoak (4) and Cleish (5).

From 1894 elected parish councils replaced the parochial boards. These in turn were abolished in 1930, and the powers they had exercised passed to the county council. Parishes continue to be used today for statistical purposes, though they no longer have any administrative function.

Settlements
 
Carnbo
Cleish
Crook of Devon
Dalqueich
Drunzie
Duncrievie
Glenfarg
Glenlomond
Kinnesswood
Kinross
Milnathort
Scotlandwell
Stronachie
Tillyrie

Transport
Kinross-shire is bisected north–south by the M90 motorway, which links Kinross to Perth in the north and Dunfermline in the south. The A911 enables west to east travel across the county.

There are no train stations; previously there was one at Kinross however this is no longer open.

Parliamentary constituency

Historic

From 1426 the county returned one member to the Parliament of Scotland.

United Kingdom parliament

Following the Act of Union, Kinross-shire returned members to the House of Commons in Westminster. Due to its small population, it was never a constituency in its own right: instead it alternated with Clackmannanshire, a member being returned for one county at one parliament and for the other at the next.
The Representation of the People (Scotland) Act 1832 merged the two counties into a single constituency, Clackmannanshire and Kinross-shire.

In 1918, House of Commons seats were redistributed, and Kinross-shire was combined with part of Perthshire to form the constituency of Kinross and Western Perthshire. This constituency continued in existence until 1983.

Coat of arms
The Kinross County Council received a grant of arms from Lord Lyon King of Arms on 18 May 1927. The arms depict Loch Leven Castle. The motto adopted was "for all time": at the time of the grant the county council was campaigning to retain its independence from its larger neighbour Perthshire.

When Perth and Kinross District Council was granted arms in 1977, the Kinross-shire arms were placed on an inescutcheon, or small shield, in the centre of the new arms. These arms continue in use by the current Perth and Kinross Council.

Places of interest
 
Cleish Castle
Loch Leven Castle

References

External links
Perth & Kinross Council
A Vision of Britain Through Time: A vision of Perth and Kinross

Counties of Scotland
Counties of the United Kingdom (1801–1922)